The list of marine heterobranch gastropods of South Africa is a list of saltwater mollusc species that form a part of the molluscan fauna of South Africa. This list does not include the land or freshwater molluscs.

This is a sub-list of the list of marine gastropods of South Africa, which is in turn a sub-list of the list of marine molluscs of South Africa.

Heterobranchia 

Architectonicidae
Variegated sundial shell Heliacus variegatus (Gmelin, 1791) (Eastern Cape to Mozambique)

Siphonariidae - False limpets
Siphonaria annaea Tomlin, 1944 (Durban northwards)
Cape False limpet Siphonaria capensis Quoy and Gaimard (Namibia to northern KwaZulu-Natal)
 Siphonaria compressa Allanson, 1958
Siphonaria concinna Sowerby, 1824 (Cape Point to Zululand)
Siphonaria nigerrima Smith, 1903 (Zululand to Mozambique)
Siphonaria oculus Krauss, 1848 (Cape Point to Zululand)
Siphonaria serrata Fischer, 1807 (Saldanha Bay to Zululand)
Siphonaria tenuicostulata Smith, 1903 (Durban to Mozambique)

Ringiculidae
Ringicula turtoni Bartsch, 1915

Acteonidae
Acteon fortis Thiele, 1925
Acteon flammeus (Gmelin, 1791)
Acteon pudicus (A. Adams, 1854)
Rictaxis albis (Sowerby, 1873)
Japonacteon sp.
Pupa affinis (A. Adams, 1854)
Pupa niecaensis (Barnard, 1963)
Pupa solidula (Linnaeus, 1758)
Pupa sulcata (Gmelin, 1791)
Pupa suturalis (A. Adams, 1854)
Pupa tessellata (Reeve, 1842)

Bullinidae
Bullina scabra Gmelin, 1791
Bullina oblonga Sowerby, 1897

Hydatinidae
Polka-dot bubble shell Micromelo undata (Brughiere, 1792) (Transkei to Mozambique)
Striped bubble shell Hydatina physis (Linnaeus, 1758) (Eastern Cape to Mozambique)
Hydatina amplustre (Linnaeus, 1758)
Hydatina velum (Gmelin, 1791)
Hydatina albocincta (van der Hoeven, 1811)

Cylichnidae
Cylichnella agulhasensis (Thiele, 1925)
Cylichnella meridionalis (Smith, 1902)
Cylichnella miniscula (Turton, 1932)
Cylichnella natalensis (Barnard, 1963)
Cylichnella nitens (Smith, 1872)
Cylichnella smithi (Bartsch, 1915)
Cylichna africana Bartsch, 1915
Cylichna bistriata Tomlin, 1920
Cylichna dulcis Thiele. 1925
Cylichna nitens Smith, 1903
Cylichna remissa Smith, 1890
Cylichna tubulosa Gould, 1859
Scaphander punctostriatus (Mighels. 1841)

Retusidae
Retusa agulhasensis Thiele, 1925
Retusa natalensis Barnard, 1963
Retusa sp. cf. nicobarica Thiele, 1925
Retusa sp. cf. semen Thiele, 1925
Retusa truncatula Bruguiere, 1792
Volvulella mutabilis (Barnard, 1963)
Volvulella pia (Thiele, 1925)
Volvulella rostrata (A. Adams, 1854)

Philinidae
Sand slug Philine aperta (Linnaeus, 1767) (Cape Columbine to Mozambique)
Philine berghi Smith, 1910

Gastropteridae
Gastropteron flavobrunneum Gosliner, 1984
Gastropteron alboaurantium Gosliner, 1984

Aglajidae
Slipper slug Philinopsis capensis (Bergh, 1907)
Philinopsis dubia (O'Donoghue, 1929)
Philinopsis cyanea(Martens, 1879)
Chelidonura fulvipunctata Baba, 1938
Chelidonura hurundinina (Quoy and Gaimard, 1824)

Haminoeidae
Atys cylindrica (Heibling, 1779)
Green bubble shell Haminoea alfredensis Bartsch, 1915 (Namaqualand to Eastern Cape)
Haminoea natalensis (Krauss, 1848) (KwaZulu-Natal)
Roxania utriculus (Brocchi, 1814)
Smaragdinella sieboldi A. Adams, 1864
Smaragdinella calyculata (Broderip and Sowerby, 1829)
Phenerophthalmus smaragdinus (Ruppell and Leuckart, 1831)

Runcinidae
Metaruncina sp.

Bullidae
Bulla ampulla (Linnaeus 1758)

Limacinidae 
Limacina bulimoides (Orbigny, 1836)
Limacina antarctica Woodward, 1854 - mentioned in traditional views as Limacina helicina (Phipps, 1774) (cf.)
Limacina inflata (Orbigny, 1836)
Limacina lesueurii (Orbigny, 1836)
Limacina trochiformis (Orbigny, 1836)

Cavoliniidae
Cavolinia gibbosa (Orbigny, 1836)
Cavolinia globosa (Gray, 1850)
Cavolinia inflexa (Lesueur, 1813)
Cavolinia tridentata (Niebuhr, 1775)
Clio andreae (Boas, 1886)
Clio chaptalii Gray, 1850
Clio cuspidata (Bosc, 1802)
Clio pyramidata Linnaeus, 1767
Creseis acicula (Rang, 1828)
Creseis virgula (Rang, 1828)
Cuvierina columnella (Rang, 1827)
Diacria quadridentata (Blainville, 1821)
Diacria trispinosa (Blainville, 1821)
Styliola subula (Quoy and Gaimard, 1827)

Peraclididae
Peraclis moluccensis (Tesch, 1903)
Peraclis reticulata (Orbigny, 1836)

Cymbuliidae
Cymbulia sibogae Tesch, 1903
Gleba cordata Niebuhr, 1776

Desmopteridae
Desmopterus papilio Chun 1889

Gymnosomata

Clionidae
Clione limacina (Phipps, 1774) (Pelagic northern and southern hemispheres) (southern hemisphere may be a distinct species, Clione antarctica)

Pneumodermatidae
Spongiobranchaea australis (d'Orbigny, 1836) (Pelagic, southern hemisphere)

Anaspidea

Akeridae
Akera soluta (Gmelin 1791)

Aplysiidae
Dwarf sea hare Aplysia parvula Morch, 1863
Spotted sea hare Aplysia oculifera Adams and Reeve, 1850 (Cape Point to northern KwaZulu-Natal)
Aplysia dactylomela Rang, 1828
Aplysia maculata Rang, 1828
Variable sea hare Aplysia juliana Quoy and Gaimard, 1832
Shaggy sea hare Bursatella leachi leachi (Blainville. 1817) (Cape Columbine to Mozambique)
Shaggy sea hare Bursatella leachi africana (Engel, 1927)
Wedge sea hare Dolabella auricularia (Solander, 1786) (Mossel Bay to Mozambique)
Dolabrifera dolabrifera (Rang, 1828)
Paraplysia lowii Gilchrist, 1900
Stylocheilus longicauda (Quoy and Gaimard 1824)

Sacoglossa

Oxynoidae
Lobiger souverbiei Fischer, 1856
Lophopleurella capensis (Thiele, 1912)
Oxynoe viridis (Pease, 1861)
Oxynoe sp.

Juliidae
Berthelinia schlumbergeri Dautzenberg, 1895
Julia zebra Kawaguti, 1981

Volvatellidae
Ascobulla fischeri (Adams & Angas, 1864)
Volvatella laguncula Sowerby, 1894

Placobranchidae
Elysia halimedae Macnae, 1954
Elysia marginata (Pease, 1871)
Elysia moebii (Bergh, 1888)
Elysia livida Baba, 1955
Elysia rufescens (Pease, 1871)
Elysia vatae Risbec, 1928
Elysia virgata (Bergh, 1888)
Plant-sucking nudibranch Elysia viridis (Montagu, 1804) (Namaqualand to northern KwaZulu-Natal)
Plant-sucking nudibranch Elysia sp. This may be the same species as listed above as E. viridis. There may be question of identification.
Elysia spp. (7)

Limapontiidae
Dendritic nudibranch Placida dendritica (Alder & Hancock, 1843)
Stiliger ornatus Ehrenberg, 1831

Caliphyllidae
Mourgona sp.
Polybranchia orientalis (Kelaart, 1858) - cited as Phyllobranchillus orientalis

Hermaeidae
Table Bay nudibranch Aplysiopsis sinusmensalis (Macnae, 1954)

Notaspidea

Umbraculidae
Tylodina alfredensis Turton, 1932
Umbrella pleurobranch Umbraculum sinicum (Gmelin, 1783) (transkei to Mozambique)

Pleurobranchidae
Berthella plumula (Montagu, 1803)
Berthella tupala Marcus, 1957
Berthella sp.
Lemon pleurobranch Berthellina citrina (Ruppell and Leuckart, 1828) (Cape Point to Mozambique)
Lemon pleurobranch Berthellina granulata (Krauss, 1848)  (This may replace previous entry B. citrina)
Euselenops luniceps (Cuvier, 1817)
Pleurobranchaea algoensis Thiele, 1925
Pleurobranchaea brockii Bergh, 1897
Pleurobranchaea melanopus Bergh, 1907
Pleurobranchaea pleurobrancheana (Bergh, 1907)
Dwarf warty pleurobranch Pleurobranchaea tarda Verrill, 1880
Warty pleurobranch Pleurobranchaea bubala Marcus and Gosliner, 1984 (Cape Point to Eastern Cape)
Pleurobranchella nicobarica Thiele, 1925
Mosaic pleurobranch Pleurobranchus albiguttatus (Bergh, 1905) 
Pleurobranchus disceptus O'Donoghue, 1929
Pleurobranchus inhacae Macnae, 1962
Pleurobranchus moebii Vayssiere, 1898
Pleurobranchus nigropunctatus (Bergh, 1907)
Pleurobranchus papillosa (O'Donoghue, 1929)
Pleurobranchus peroni Cuvier, 1804
Pleurobranchus perrieri Vayssiere, 1896
Pleurobranchus sculptata (O'Donoghue, 1929)
Pleurobranchus xhosa Macnae, 1962

Nudibranchia - Nudibranchs

Bathydorididae
Doridoxa benthalis Barnard, 1963

Dorididae
Aldisa benguelae Gosliner, 1985
Three-spot nudibranch Aldisa trimaculata Gosliner, 1985
?Alloiodoris inhacae O'Donoghue, 1929
Archidoris capensis Bergh, 1907
Archidoris scripta Bergh, 1907
Rugby ball dorid or Spined dorid Atagema rugosa Pruvot-Fol, 1951
Atagema gibba Pruvot-Fol, 1951
Warty dorid Doris verrucosa Linnaeus, 1758 Orange river to Eastern Cape
 Doris granosa (Bergh, 1907)
Doris spp. (2)
Doriopsis pecten (Collingwood, 1881)
? Ocellate dorid Gargamella sp.1
?Gargamella sp.2
Velvet dorid Jorunna tomentosa (Cuvier, 1804)
Dotted nudibranch Jorunna zania (Transkei to northern KwaZulu-Natal)Marcus 1976

The following four species are listed as incertae sedis by Gosliner:
Doris natalensis Krauss, 1848
Doris pseudida Bergh, 1907
Doris perplexa Bergh, 1907
Doris glabella Bergh, 1907

Actinocyclidae
Hallaxa sp.

Chromodorididae
Saddled nudibranch Cadlina sp.1
Brown-dotted nudibranch Cadlina sp.2
Cadlina sp.3
 Cadlina sp.4
Cadlinella ornatissima (Risbec, 1928)
Ceratosoma cornigerum (Adams and Reeve, 1850)
Inkspot nudibranch or Lipstick nudibranch Ceratosoma ingozi Gosliner, 1996
Ceratosoma tenue Abraham, 1876
Chromodoris africana Eliot 1904
Chromodoris albolimbata Bergh, 1907
Chromodoris alderi Collingwood, 1881
Polka-dot chromodorid Chromodoris annulata Eliot 1904 (Transkei to northern KwaZulu-Natal)
Chromodoris boucheti Rudman, 1982
Chromodoris conchyliata Yonow, 1984
Chromodoris euelpis Bergh, 1907
Chromodoris fidelis Kelaart, 1858
Chromodoris geminus Rudman, 1987
Chromodoris cf. geminus
Chromodoris geometrica Risbec, 1928
Chromodoris hamiltoni Rudman, 1977
Red-spotted nudibranch or Heather's nudibranch Chromodoris heatherae Gosliner, 1994
Chromodoris inopinata Bergh, 1905
Chromodoris marginata Pease, 1860
Chromodoris porcata Bergh, 1888
Chromodoris tinctoria (Ruppell and Leuckart, 1828)
Gaudy chromodorid Chromodoris vicina Eliot, 1904 (Central to northern KwaZulu-Natal)
Chromodoris spp. (7) 
Durvilledoris lemniscata (Quoy and Gaimard, 1832)
Glossodoris atromarginata (Cuvier 1804)
Glossodoris cincta (Bergh, 1888)
Glossodoris pallida (Ruppell and Leuckart, 1830)
Glossodoris symmetricus Rudman, 1990
Glossodoris undaurum Rudman, 1985
Glossodoris spp. (4)
Hypselodoris bullockii (Collingwood, 1881)
Cape dorid Hypselodoris capensis (Barnard, 1927) (Cape Columbine to Transkei)
Hypselodoris carnea (Bergh, 1889)
Hypselodoris fucata Gosliner & Johnson, 1999
Mottled dorid Hypselodoris infucata (Ruppell and Leuckart, 1828) (Central KwaZulu-Natal to Mozambique)
Hypselodoris maculosa (Pease, 1871)
Hypselodoris maridadilus Rudman, 1977
Hypselodoris rudmani Gosliner and Johnson, 1999
Hypselodoris spp. (3) 
Hypselodoris sp. 
Noumea varians (Pease, 1871)
Noumea purpurea Baba, 1949
Protea nudibranch Noumea protea Gosliner, 1994 
Risbecia pulchella (Ruppell and Leuckart, 1828)
Thorunna horologia Rudman, 1984

Discodorididae
Discodoris coerulescens Bergh, 1888
Discodoris fragilis (Alder and Hancock, 1864)
Small-spot dorid Discodoris sp.1
Discodoris sp.2
Blotchy dorid Geitodoris capensis Bergh, 1907
Anisodoris sp. (2)
Thordisa burnupi Eliot, 1910
Thordisa punctifera Bergh, 1907
Thordisa spp. (2)
? Variable dorid Aphelodoris brunnea Bergh, 1907(needs confirmation in Discodorididae)
? Chocolate-chip nudibranch Aphelodoris sp. 1
? Brown-spotted nudibranch Aphelodoris sp. 2
? Spiky nudibranch Aphelodoris sp.3 
?Sclerodoris apiculata (Alder and Hancock, 1864)(needs confirmation in Discodorididae)
?Sclerodoris coriacea (Eliot, 1904)(see above)
?Sclerodoris sp.(see above)
?Artachaea sp,(see above)
Halgerda carlsoni Rudman, 1928
Halgerda dichromis Fahey and Gosliner, 1999
Halgerda tessellata Bergh, 1880
Halgerda toliara Fahey and Gosliner, 1999
Halgerda wasinensis Eliot, 1904
Halgerda formosa Bergh, 1880
Halgerda punctata Farran, 1902
Rostanga muscula (Abraham, 1877)
 Red sponge nudibranch  or Orange dorid Rostanga elandsia Garovoy, Valdes & Gosliner, 2001
 Rostanga phepha Garovoy, Valdés & Gosliner, 2001

Phyllidiidae
Ceratophyllidia africana Eliot, 1903
Phyllidia ocellata Cuvier, 1804
Ridged nudibranch Phyllidia varicosa Lamarck, 1801 (Central KwaZulu_Natal to Mozambique)(P. coelestis? (Bergh 1905))
Phyllidiella zeylanica (Kelaart, 1859)
Phyllidia sp.

Dendrodorididae
Blue-speckled nudibranch Dendrodoris caesia (Bergh, 1907)
Dendrodoris callosa (Bergh, 1907)
Tan dorid Dendrodoris capensis (Bergh, 1907)
Dendrodoris denisoni (Angas, 1864)
Dendrodoris nigra (Stimpson, 1855)
Dendrodoris rubra (Kelaart, 1858)
Dendrodoris spp. (3)
Scribbled nudibranch Doriopsilla miniata (Alder and Hancock, 1864)
White-spotted nudibranch Doriopsilla capensis Bergh, 1907
Doriopsilla spp. (2)
 
Mandeliidae
Mandela's nudibranch Mandelia mirocornata Valdes & Gosliner, 1999

Onchidorididae
Fluffy nudibranch Acanthodoris planca
Diaphodoris sp.

Corambidae
Crazed nudibranch Corambe sp.

Goniodorididae
Giraffe spot nudibranch Ancula sp.
Tugboat nudibranch Goniodoris mercurialis Macnae, 1958
Goniodoris castanea Alder and Hancock, 1845
Goniodoris ovata Barnard, 1934
Goniodoris sp.
Fiery nudibranch Okenia amoenula (Bergh, 1907)
Okenia sp.
White lined nudibranch Trapania sp.1
Trapania sp.(2)

Polyceridae
Crimora sp.
Kalinga ornata Alder and Hancock, 1864
Tasseled nudibranch Kaloplocamus ramosus (Cantraine, 1835)
Orange-clubbed nudibranch Limacia clavigera (Muller, 1776) (Cape Columbine to Eastern Cape)
Nembrotha livingstonei Allan, 1933
Nembrotha purpureolineata O'Donoghue, 1924
Plocamopherus apheles (Barnard, 1927)
Plocamopherus maculatus (Pease, 1860)
Plocamopherus sp.
Crowned nudibranch Polycera capensis Quoy and Gaimard, 1824 (Orange river to Eastern Cape)
Polycera hedgpethi Marcus, 1964
Four lined nudibranch Polycera quadrilineata (Muller, 1776)
Polycera sp. (not same as Twin crowned or Orange lined crowned)
Twin-crowned nudibranch Polycera sp.1
Orange lined crowned nudibranch Polycera sp.2
Roboastra gracilis (Bergh, 1877)
Roboastra luteolineata (Baba, 1936)
Black nudibranch Tambja capensis (Bergh, 1907) (Cape Point to Tsitsikamma)
Tambja morosa (Bergh, 1877)
Tambja sp.
Thecacera pacifica (Bergh, 1883)
Thecacera pennigera (Montagu, 1804)
Thecacera sp.

Aegiridae
Knobbly nudibranch Aegires ninguis Fahey & Gosliner, 2004

Gymnodorididae
Gymnodoris alba (Bergh, 1877)
Gymnodoris ceylonica (Kelaart, 1858)
Gymnodoris inornata (Bergh, 1880)
Gymnodoris okinawae Baba, 1936
Gymnodoris spp. (2)
Ghost nudibranch Lecithophorus capensis Macnae, 1958
Lecithophorus sp.

Hexabranchidae
Spanish dancer Hexabranchus sanguineus (Ruppell and Leuckart, 1828) (KwaZulu-Natal south coast to Mozambique)

Okadaiidae
Okadaia elegans Baba 1931

Charcotiidae
Frilled nudibranch or Smits nudibranch Leminda millecra Griffiths, 1985

Dotidae
Crowned doto Doto africoronata Shipman & Gosliner, 2015
Feathered doto Doto pinnatifida (Montagu, 1804)
Doto rosea Trinchese, 1881

Embletoniidae
Embletonia gracilis Risbec, 1928

Proctonotidae
Gas flame nudibranch Bonisa nakaza Gosliner, 1981 (Cape Peninsula to Eastern Cape)
Cape silvertip nudibranch or Silvertip nudibranch Janolus capensis Bergh, 1907 (Cape Columbine to Eastern Cape)
Medallion silvertip nudibranch Janolus longidentatus Gosliner, 1981
Nippled nudibranch Janolus sp. 

Arminidae
Armina berghi Thiele, 1925
Armina capensis (Bergh, 1907)
Armina euchroa (Bergh, 1907) 
Gilchrists sand slug Armina gilchristi (Bergh, 1907) 
Armina grisea O'Donoghue, 1927 
Armina microdonta (Bergh, 1907) 
Armina natalensis (Bergh, 1866) 
Armina serrata O'Donoghue, 1929 
Armina simoniana Thiele, 1925 
Striped sand slug or Pierre's armina Armina sp.
White-ridged nudibranch Dermatobranchus sp. 1 (Gosliner)
Dermatobranchus sp. 2
Dermatobranchus sp. 3
Brown ridged nudibranch or narrow ridged nudibranch Dermatobranchus sp. 4 (Gosliner)

Tritoniidae
Whip fan nudibranch Tritonia nilsodhneri Marcus, 1983
Tritonia aurantiacum Barnard, 1927
Tritonia pallida Stimpson, 1854
Tritonia indecora Bergh, 1907
Soft coral nudibranch Tritonia sp. 1 (Gosliner)
Brush nudibranch Tritonia sp. 2 (Gosliner) 
Tritoniadoxa capensis Bergh, 1907
?Marionia spp. (2) (is Marionia valid and in Tritoniidae?)
Marionia cyanobranchiata (Ruppell and Leuckart, 1831) (species inquirenda)

Aranucidae
Marianina rosea Pruvot-Fol, 1930

Bornellidae
Bornella adamsii Gray, 1850
Bornella anguilla Johnson, 1983

Dendronotidae

Scyllaeidae
Iridescent nudibranch Notobryon wardi Ohdner, 1936 (Namaqualand to Tsitsikamma)
Scyllaea pelagica Linnaeus, 1758

Tethydidae
 Dinosaur nudibranch Melibe liltvedi Gosliner, 1987
Cowled nudibranch Melibe rosea Rang, 1829 (Orange river to Eastern Cape)
Melibe pilosa Pease, 1860
Melibe sp.

Flabellinidae
Purple lady Flabellina funeka Gosliner and Griffiths, 1981
White-edged nudibranch or Chalk stripe nudibranch Flabellina capensis (Thiele, 1025)
Flabellina spp. (3)
Coryphellina sp.

Fionidae
Fiona pinnata (Eschscholtz, 1831)

Eubranchidae
Eubranchus sp.1
Eubranchus sp.2
Eubranchus sp.3
Fireworks nudibranch Eubranchus sp.4
Candelabra nudibranch Eubranchus sp.5 (Zsilavecz)

Tergipedidae
Candy nudibranch Cuthona speciosa (Macnae, 1954)
Cuthona ornata Baba, 1937
Cuthona kanga (Edmunds, 1970)
Cuthona anulata (Baba, 1949)
Cuthona spp. (5)
Yellow candy nudibranch Cuthona sp.6
Cuthona sp.
Tergipes tergipes Forskal, 1779
Catriona casha Gosliner and Griffiths, 1981
Catriona columbiana O'Donoghue, 1922
Catriona sp.
Phestilla melanobrachia Bergh, 1874

Aeolidiidae
Indian nudibranch Aeolidiella indica Bergh, 1888 (Cape Columbine to central KwaZulu-Natal)
Aeolidiella alba Risbec, 1928
Berghia chaka Gosliner, 1985
Baeolidia palythoae Gosliner, 1985

Facelinidae
Night sky nudibranch Amanda armata Macnae, 1954
Caloria indica (Bergh, 1896)
Black-dot nudibranch Caloria sp. 1
Yellow-tipped nudibranch Caloria sp. 2
Caloria sp. 3
Orange eyed nudibranch or White tipped nudibranch Cratena capensis Barnard, 1927 (Cape Columbine to Eastern Cape)
Cratena simba Edmunds, 1970
Elegant nudibranch Cratena sp.1
Cratena spp. (+3)
Echinopsole fulvus Macnae, 1954
Olive nudibranch Facelina olivacea Macnae, 1954
Facellina annulata Macnae, 1954
Facellina sp.
Favorinus japonicus Baba, 1949
Favorinus ghanensis Edmunds, 1968
Moridilla brockii (Bergh, 1888)
Coral nudibranch Phyllodesmium serratum (Baba, 1949) (Cape Point to northern KwaZulu-Natal)
Coral nudibranch Phyllodesmium horridum (Macnae, 1954)  (this may replace previous entry P. serratum)
Phyllodesmium hyalinum Ehrenberg, 1831
Phyllodesmium sp. 
Pruvotfolia pselliotes (Labbe, 1923)
Pteraeolidia ianthina (Angas, 1864)

Glaucidae
Four-colour nudibranch Godiva quadricolor (Barnard, 1927) (Cape Point to Eastern Cape)
Sea swallow Glaucus atlanticus Forster, 1777 (Cape Point to northern KwaZulu-Natal)

Family ?
Platydoris scabra (Cuvier 1806)
Platydoris cruenta (Quoy and Gaimard 1932)
Platydoris sp.

Cavoliniidae
Wing footed opisthobranchs Cavolinia spp.

Pulmonata

Onchidiidae
Airbreathing sea slug Onchidella capensis (Orange river to Cape Point)
Peronia peronii (Cuvier, 1804) (Northern KwaZulu-Natal)

References

Further reading
 

 Gastropod Marine, Heterobranch
.South Africa
South Africa, Heterobranch
Gastropod, marine heterobranch
South Africa, Gastropod Heterobranch
Marine biodiversity of South Africa